Socorro Consolidated School District (SCSD) or Socorro Consolidated Schools is a school district headquartered in Socorro, New Mexico.

Located within Socorro County, the district includes Socorro, Alamillo, Chamizal, Escondida, Lemitar, Luis Lopez, Polvadera, San Acacia, San Antonio, and San Antonito.

History
Randall K. Earwood became the superintendent in 2012.

In 2020 Ron Hendrix, the superintendent that year, advocated for opening the 2020–2021 school year, during the COVID-19 pandemic in New Mexico, with students physically at school instead of virtual learning.

Schools
 Secondary schools
 Socorro High School
 Sarracino Middle School

 Elementary schools
 Midway Elementary School
 Parkview Elementary School
 San Antonio Elementary

 Charter schools
 Cottonwood Valley Charter

References

External links
 Socorro Consolidated Schools
 Old website

School districts in New Mexico